Glommen may refer to:

the Swedish name for Glomma, Norwegian river
Glommen, locality in Falkenberg Municipality, Sweden
Glommen (newspaper), named after the river